Lance Corporal John Joseph Caffrey  VC (23 October 1891 – 22 February 1953), was a British Army soldier and an Irish recipient of the Victoria Cross (VC), the highest award for gallantry in the face of the enemy that is awarded to British and Commonwealth forces.

Early life
Caffrey left Ireland at an early age and settled in Nottingham (a city in Nottinghamshire, England), joining the British Army in 1910.

Military service
Caffrey was 24 years old, and a private in the 2nd Battalion, York and Lancaster Regiment, of the British Army during the First World War when the following deed took place for which he was awarded the VC.

A corporal of the RAMC and Private Caffrey at once tried to rescue him, but at the first attempt were driven back by shrapnel from enemy fire. They tried again and succeeded in reaching and bandaging the wounded man. However, just as they were lifting him up, the RAMC corporal was shot in the head. Private Caffrey bandaged the corporal and helped him back to safety, and then returned and brought in the other wounded man.

Caffrey later achieved the rank of Sergeant and served in the Home Guard during World War II. He was employed in civilian life as a commissionaire.
He died in Derby, England on 22 February 1953.

His Victoria Cross is displayed at The York and Lancaster Regiment Museum within the Clifton Park Museum in Rotherham, South Yorkshire, England.

References

Further reading
Listed in order of publication year
The Register of the Victoria Cross (1981, 1988 and 1997)

Ireland's VCs (Dept of Economic Development, 1995)
Monuments to Courage (David Harvey, 1999)
Irish Winners of the Victoria Cross (Richard Doherty & David Truesdale, 2000)

1891 births
1953 deaths
Burials in Nottinghamshire
Irish soldiers in the British Army
People from Birr, County Offaly
York and Lancaster Regiment soldiers
British Army personnel of World War I
Irish World War I recipients of the Victoria Cross
Recipients of the Cross of St. George
Sherwood Foresters soldiers
British Home Guard soldiers
British Army recipients of the Victoria Cross
Military personnel from County Offaly